Clifford Glen Eidelman (born December 5, 1964) is an American composer and conductor who has scored films including Star Trek VI: The Undiscovered Country, Free Willy 3: The Rescue, and Christopher Columbus: The Discovery.

Career 
Eidelman began his formal training in violin at the age of eight and continued with multi-instrument training ranging from piano and guitar in genres such as jazz to classic music in his youth. After studying music at Santa Monica College and the University of Southern California, he scored his first feature film Magdalene in 1989.

His breakthrough composition was the 1991 score to Star Trek VI: The Undiscovered Country.

In the years after, Eidelman continued to compose dramatic and epic scores such as Christopher Columbus: The Discovery. As Eidelman's style of composing changed towards more sentimental and minimalistic scores, so did the films for which he scored.

Eidelman currently resides in Santa Monica, California and continues to score movies.

Notable scores (concert music)

 The Five Tales for Solo Piano (2019)
 Night in the Gallery for Chamber Ensemble (released 2019) (performed and recorded by Members of the London Symphony Orchestra)
 Symphony for Orchestra and Two Pianos (released 2018) (performed and recorded by the London Symphony Orchestra)
 Wedding in the Night Garden (2000) (performed by the Los Angeles Master Chorale)
 The Tempest (1997) (recorded by the Royal Scottish National Orchestra)

References

External links
 
* Cliff Eidelman at Filmtracks.com
 Cliff Eidelman at SoundtrackNet

1964 births
American film score composers
American male film score composers
Living people
Musicians from Los Angeles
Santa Monica College alumni
USC Thornton School of Music alumni
Varèse Sarabande Records artists